Daniel Minter (born 1961, Ellaville, Georgia) is an African-American artist and educator working in painting, sculpture, illustration, assemblage, and public art.

Education 
Minter received his A.A. from Art Institute of Atlanta. In 2019, he received an Honorary Doctorate of Arts from Maine College of Art.

Career 
Early in his career, Minter worked as a graphic designer. He has illustrated twelve children's books, including two award-winning collaborations with the author Kelly Starling Lyons: Ella's Broom, which won the 2013 Coretta Scott King Book Honor, and Going Down Home with Daddy, which was a 2020 Caldecott Honor recipient.

Minter has also designed two Kwanzaa stamps for the United States Postal Service, issued in 2004 and in 2011.

Minter now lives in Portland, Maine, where he continues his creative work and assists with The Underground Railroad, of which he is a board member. Minter's work has appeared at many shows throughout Portland and can be seen in the official logos of the Underground Rail-Road and the Maine Interfaith Youth Alliance.

Books (Illustrated) 

 2019 Going Down Home with Daddy, by Kelly Starling Lyons
 2019 The Women Who Caught The Babies: A Story of African American Midwives, by Eloise Greenfield
 2019: I Remember: Poems and Pictures of Heritage, compiled by Lee Bennett Hopkins
 2018 So Tall Within: Sojourner Truth's Long Walk Toward Freedom, by Gary D. Schmidt
 2017 Cay and Adlee Find Their Voice, by Russell J Quaglia and Cali Quaglia
 2016 Step Right Up: How Doc and Jim Key Taught the World about Kindness, by Donna Janell Bowman
 2012 Ellen's Broom, by Kelly Starling Lyons
 2006 The First Marathon: The Legend of Pheidippides, by Susan Reynolds
 2002 New Year Be Coming!: A Gullah Year, by Katharine Boling
 2000 Seven Spools of Thread: A Kwanzaa Story, by Angela Shelf Medearis
 1998 Bubber Goes to Heaven, by Arna Bontemps
 1994 The Foot Warmer and the Crow, by Evelyn Coleman

Awards 

 2020 Caldecott Honor
 2013 Coretta Scott King Illustrator Honor, Ellen’s Broom 
 1994 National Endowment for the Arts and Arts International, Travel Grants Fund for Artists, Salvador Bahia Brazil

References

Daniel Minter Resume 2003

1963 births
Living people
20th-century American painters
20th-century American sculptors
American stamp designers
People from Schley County, Georgia
African-American sculptors
21st-century African-American artists
20th-century African-American painters
21st-century American painters
21st-century American sculptors